South Park Family School is an elementary school in Victoria, British Columbia, Canada.  It is located in a historic, two-storey Queen Anne Style brick building located at 508 Douglas St. in Victoria's James Bay neighbourhood, across the road from Beacon Hill Park.

See also
 List of historic places in Victoria, British Columbia

References

External links
 

1894 establishments in Canada
Buildings and structures in Victoria, British Columbia
School buildings completed in 1894
Schools in British Columbia